Father Is a Bachelor is a 1950 American musical romantic comedy film directed by Abby Berlin and Norman Foster. It stars William Holden and Coleen Gray.

Plot
Carefree vagabond Johnny Rutledge lives in a small town after his medicine show employer and friend Professor Mordecai Ford is arrested. He befriends a young girl named May Chalotte and her older brothers January ("Jan"), February ("Feb") and twins March and April. Jan received word six months before that their parents had died in a riverboat accident, but has not told anybody but Feb, and now Johnny, fearing they would be sent to an orphanage. Johnny makes it clear that he is adamantly opposed to taking on any responsibilities, but somehow finds himself becoming their "uncle" anyway. He works on a farm during the week and sings and waits tables on Sunday in a restaurant owned by Jericho Schlosser to provide for the children.

When Prudence Millett, daughter of the local judge, comes to inquire why the boys are not in school, Johnny is forced to claim he is their uncle. A romance begins to blossom, despite his strong aversion to being tied down. (He had worked to drag himself out of poverty to half-ownership of a paper mill, only to have his partner abscond with all the company funds, so he gave up being a responsible citizen.)

When wealthy, unloved Jeffrey Gilland Sr. orders Johnny to keep his disreputable children away from his son Jeffrey Jr., Johnny scuffles with him and gets arrested. Prudence posts his bond, but his troubles are not over. Plato Cassin, Gilland's lawyer, finds out about the children's parents and blackmails Johnny into agreeing to marry one of his older, spinster sisters, Genevieve and Adelaide, in order to keep the kids. (Adelaide wins a game of quoits for the privilege.) Plato convinces Prudence that Johnny was using the children to court her.

After thinking it over, Johnny decides to run away with the now-released Professor Ford. May overhears and invites people to her birthday party the next day, intending it to be a going-away party for Johnny. Meanwhile, Johnny dissuades Gilland's young son from running away himself. At the party, a grateful Gilland drops the charges against him.

When May asks why Prudence cannot be her aunt instead of Adelaide, the young woman is quite willing, having seen how far Johnny is willing to go for the children. Johnny tells Adelaide that he loves Prudence. She proves to be a sport and the two women gamble for him. Professor Ford offers what he, Johnny and Jan believe is Johnny's two-headed coin. Prudence wins the toss. Later, Johnny is shocked to learn that they accidentally used a regular coin. Professor Ford leaves town, leaving Johnny with his new family.

Cast
 William Holden as Johnny Rutledge
 Coleen Gray as Prudence Millett
 Mary Jane Saunders as May Chalotte
 Charles Winninger as Professor Mordecai Ford
 Stuart Erwin as Constable Pudge Barnham
 Clinton Sundberg as Plato Cassin
 Gary Gray as Jan Chalotte
 Sig Ruman as Jericho Schlosser
 Billy Gray as Feb Chalotte
 Lloyd Corrigan as Judge Millett
 Frederic Tozere as Jeffrey Gilland Sr.
 Peggy Converse as Genevieve Cassin
 Lillian Bronson as Adelaide Cassin

Songs
Johnny sings a number of songs in the film, including "Wait 'Till the Sun Shines, Nellie" in blackface in the opening scene. His singing was dubbed by Buddy Clark.

Reception
Bosley Crowther called the film a "saccharine, paper-thin little romance" in his New York Times review.

References

External links 
 
 
 
 

1950 films
1950 romantic comedy films
American black-and-white films
American musical comedy films
American romantic comedy films
Films about orphans
Columbia Pictures films
Films directed by Abby Berlin
Films directed by Norman Foster
1950s English-language films
1950s American films